Arthur Hope may refer to:

Arthur Hope, 2nd Baron Rankeillour (1897–1958), British peer and politician
Arthur John Hope (1875–1960), English architect